Thomas Coulson (1898-1948) was an England rugby union player.

References

1898 births
1948 deaths
England international rugby union players
Rugby union number eights